Giovanna da Orvieto (1264 - 23 July 1306) was an Italian Roman Catholic professed member of the Third Order of Saint Dominic. She was known for her wise intellect and for her intense devotion to serving the will of God while being noted for being prone to ecstasies and other visions.

Her beatification process culminated on 11 September 1754 after Pope Benedict XIV approved her beatification.

Life
Giovanna da Orvieto was born in the Umbria province in 1264. She was orphaned at the age of five. Other relatives took care of her following the deaths of her parents. As she grew older, she began to visit a seamstress so as to learn a trade and not be a burden on her relatives. She worked as both a seamstress and embroiderer and during her adolescence refused prospects of marriage to instead focus on her call to the religious life. 

Very religious, she was convinced that virginity would lead to a more perfect spiritual life, she decided to take a vow of perpetual chastity. Nonetheless, her relatives arranged a marriage for her against her will. She fled to Orvieto and entered domestic service with a Dominican tertiary named Ghisla.

She decided to follow the Dominican path of spirituality and around age twenty joined that order and received the habit. In the last decade of her life she reportedly received a range of ecstatic visions.

Giovanna died in 1306. Originally buried in the church of San Domenico, her remains were later moved on 18 November 1307 to a suitable sarcophagus and then transferred on two more occasions in 1610 and on 4 May 1743 for the final time.

Beatification
A first draft of her "Legenda", made in support of the local cult that developed upon the death of Giovanna is now lost, but formed a basis for subsequent accounts.
The request for a prompt beatification was made to Pope Benedict XIII in 1728 but it was not until 11 September 1754 that Pope Benedict XIV issued a decree that confirmed the late religious' local "cultus" - otherwise known as popular veneration - and thus approved of her beatification.

The late religious is held as the patron of both seamstresses and embroiders while Pope Pius XI later made her the patron of all Italian working women in 1926.

References

External links
Saints SQPN

1264 births
1306 deaths
People from the Province of Terni
Italian Dominicans
Dominican beatified people
Italian beatified people
Third Order of Saint Dominic
Venerated Catholics
Venerated Dominicans
13th-century venerated Christians
13th-century Italian Roman Catholic religious sisters and nuns
14th-century venerated Christians
14th-century Italian Roman Catholic religious sisters and nuns
Beatifications by Pope Benedict XIV